Abacetus amaroides is a species of ground beetle in the subfamily Pterostichinae. It was described by Laferte-Senectere in 1853 and is found across West Africa and the Democratic Republic of the Congo.

References

amaroides
Beetles described in 1853
Insects of West Africa
Insects of Central Africa